Jonesville is an unincorporated community in LaSalle County, Illinois. The community is located along Illinois State Routes 71 and 351, serving as the latter's eastern terminus. It is also located near the Illinois River.

The community is part of the Ottawa, IL Micropolitan Statistical Area.

History 
Jonesville was created before the end of the Civil War in 1865. This was when the LaSalle County Carbon Coal Company opened a mineshaft, which was owned by O.L. Jones, the namesake of Jonesville. The mine closed in 1929, perhaps due to a strike by the miners. The mine was bought by Union Coal, who sold the land rather than reopening the mine.

References 

Unincorporated communities in LaSalle County, Illinois
Unincorporated communities in Illinois
Ottawa, IL Micropolitan Statistical Area